David Alan Gest (May 11, 1953 – April 12, 2016) was an American producer and television personality. Gest founded the American Cinema Awards Foundation in 1983. He produced the television special Michael Jackson: 30th Anniversary Celebration in 2001, which was the last reunion of Michael Jackson and the Jacksons coming 17 years after their previous reunion. Gest appeared on the 2006 series of the British reality television show I'm a Celebrity... Get Me Out of Here!. He frequently made tabloid headlines during his marriage with Liza Minnelli. In 2016, Gest appeared in Celebrity Big Brother 17 in the UK but elected to leave the show after 13 days due to "medical reasons". This resulted him finishing in 13th place.

Career

Early success
At the age of 17, Gest landed a job as a publicist at London Records by passing himself off as 24. Nearly a year later, he was promoted to national director of publicity and transferred over to the New York office of the label. Singer Al Green encouraged him to start a P.R. and management firm, and at age 18, he created David Gest & Associates. Green became his first client and mentor. Shortly after, he had 25 artists on his roster and generated vast success.

Later years

Gest finished in fourth place on the 2006 series of I'm a Celebrity...Get Me Out of Here!, a day before the show finished. Two days later, Gest appeared on the Royal Variety Show in London in front of Prince Charles, for which he received a standing ovation. Another two days later, a controversy arose on the cover of two major UK papers stating that more than 30,000 text votes were not counted in Gest's favour when the network ITV had a voting glitch. This would have changed the outcome of the show but Gest declined a recount.

In January 2007, Gest appeared as a judge on ITV1's Soapstar Superstar, for one night replacing Michael Ball who was coaching the singers. Later that month it was announced that Gest had signed a one-year deal with ITV to appear in his own reality series entitled This Is David Gest, which began on April 22, 2007. He also took cameras for a rare glimpse of the Jackson family house in Encino, California, where he met Tito Jackson and his children as well as matriarch Katherine Jackson. He was one of the four judges on ITV1's entertainment series Grease Is the Word and also starred on Greased Lightnin. In 2007, Gest also appeared in an episode of Gordon Ramsay's The F Word.

Gest paid ITV to be released from his contract early and ITV replied that they had no idea what to do with him. Gest was quick to say that he wanted to be released: "My lawyers negotiated an early release so I could host The Friday Night Project on Channel 4", Gest told The Sun.

Personal life and death
Gest was born to a Jewish family in Los Angeles and grew up in Southern California.

Gest and Liza Minnelli were married on March 16, 2002, and separated in July 2003. In October 2003, he sued her for $10 million, claiming that she had been violent and physically abusive during their marriage, behavior the affidavit blamed on Minnelli's persistent alcoholism. Minnelli denied the accusations, claiming Gest was simply after her money. The suit was dismissed in September 2006 for lack of triable issue of fact.

Gest was a close friend of Michael Jackson, and after Jackson's death he produced and starred in a documentary film about Jackson's life called Michael Jackson: The Life of an Icon.

In 2009, Gest sold his mansion in Memphis, Tennessee, and auctioned his rock memorabilia to put in an offer on a five-bedroom Victorian townhouse in Cambridge, England. The owners, however, took the house off the market and Gest rented a three-bedroom house in St John's Wood, North London. The same year he was the guest on Celebrity Fantasy Homes with Gaby Roslin.

Death
On April 12, 2016, Gest was found dead in his room at the Four Seasons Hotel in East London's Canary Wharf district. He was 62 years old. His death was described by police as involving no suspicious circumstances. It was later reported that he had died from a stroke. Prior to his death, Gest had been arranging a new tour entitled David Gest Is Not Dead but Alive With Soul, in reference to a misunderstanding on Celebrity Big Brother after he'd gone to bed early feeling unwell on the evening the death of David Bowie was announced. In spite of Gest's death, the tour went ahead.

After his death, it was revealed that Gest had been addicted to gambling; friends reportedly said that he had accumulated debts of up to £500,000 in the months before his death.

Gest's funeral service was held at Golders Green Crematorium in North London on April 29, 2016. His ashes were scattered in York, England.

Bibliography
Simply the Gest (Headline, 2007)

References

External links

David Gest lawsuit text, filed against Liza Minnelli in October 2003
David Gest interview on Extratv.com, 2004

1953 births
2016 deaths
20th-century American Jews
American expatriates in England
American memoirists
Television personalities from Los Angeles
Television producers from California
Liza Minnelli
Golders Green Crematorium
I'm a Celebrity...Get Me Out of Here! (British TV series) participants
Big Brother (British TV series) contestants
21st-century American Jews